Wungngayam Muirang (born 16 February 1999) is an Indian footballer who plays as a defender for Bengaluru in the Indian Super League.

Career

Gokulam Kerala
In October 2018, it was announced that Wungngayam Muirang signed for Gokulam Kerala in the I-League.

International
On 13 February 2019, Muirang was called up to the India under-23 side which participated in the 2020 AFC U-23 Championship qualifiers.

Career statistics

Club

Honours
Gokulam Kerala

 Durand Cup: 2019

Bengaluru
 Durand Cup: 2022

References

1999 births
Gokulam Kerala FC players
Bengaluru FC players
Living people
Footballers from Manipur
Indian footballers
Association football defenders
People from Ukhrul district
Naga people